Ranst is a municipality in the province of Antwerp in Belgium.

Ranst or van Ranst or variant, may also refer to:

People
 Constantin Ranst de Jonge (1635–1714; Latin: Constantinus Ranst), Dutch businessman
 C. W. Van Ranst (1892–1972), U.S. race driver
 Marc Van Ranst (born 1965), Belgian public health official and virologist
 Maurice Van Ranst, Olympic champion for Belgium at the 1920 Olympics
 Wouter Berthout van Ranst (13th c.), Flemish nobleman

Other uses
 Ranst Heliport, Antwerpen, Belgium; see List of airports in Belgium
 Ranst, a planned tram stop on the Tram route 8 (Antwerp)

See also

 

nl:Van Ranst